Phantom from Space is a 1953 independently made American black-and-white science fiction film produced and directed by W. Lee Wilder that stars Ted Cooper, Noreen Nash, Dick Sands, and Burt Wenland. The original screenplay was written by William Raynor and Myles Wilder. Working with most of the same crew, this was one of several early 1950s films made by Wilder and son Myles on a financing-for-distribution basis with United Artists and, on occasion, RKO Radio Pictures.

Plot
Federal Communications Commission (FCC) investigators arrive in the San Fernando Valley after what appears to be a flying saucer crash, causing massive interference with tele-radio transmissions. During their investigation, they receive eyewitness reports of what appears to be a man dressed in a bizarre outfit, which appears to be radioactive and thus a public threat.

Their investigation uncovers that the man is actually a humanoid creature from outer space, who is invisible without his spacesuit. They start a massive manhunt for the invisible, radioactive alien running loose.

The action culminates in Los Angeles where the invisible alien has been tracked. He becomes trapped inside the famous Griffith Observatory. A woman lab assistant discovers that he can be seen using ultraviolet light. The alien attempts to communicate by tapping out a code, but no one can understand it. Now breathing heavily because his breathing gas reserves are now running low, he is trapped high-up on the Griffith telescope's upper platform. Because he can no longer survive without his breathing gas, he falters and then falls to his death. His body briefly becomes visible before completely evaporating

Cast

 Ted Cooper as Lt. Hazen
 Noreen Nash as Barbara Randall
 Tom Daly as Charlie
 Steve Acton as Mobile Center Dispatcher
 Burt Wenland as Agent Joe
 Lela Nelson as Betty Evans
 Harry Landers as Lt. Bowers
 Burt Arnold as Darrow
 Sandy Sanders as First Policeman
 Harry Strang as Neighbor
 Jim Bannon as Desk Sgt. Jim
 Jack Daly as Joe Wakeman
 Michael Mark as Refinery Watchman
 Rudolph Anders as Dr. Wyatt
 James Seay as Major Andrews
 Steve Clark as Bill Randall
 Dick Sands as The Phantom

Production and release
W. Lee Wilder formed a film production company in the early 1950s called Planet Filmplays for the purpose of producing and directing "quickie" low-budget science fiction films, with screenplays co-written with his son Miles.

Phantom from Space uses stock footage of radar rigs. Some of this stock footage would later reappear in Killers from Space (1954).

Phantom from Space opened on May 15, 1953.

Legend Films released a colorized version of the film.

Reception
Film historian and critic Glenn Erickson reviewed the film's DVD release. He wrote, "After a couple of uninspired potboilers in the late 1940s (The Pretender is actually a good movie), Wilder hit his groove of incompetence with this no-budget wonder concerning the saddest space invader on record ... Endless talky scenes alternate with the entire cast of 6 running back and forth in the old interior of the Griffith Planetarium. The poor invader is a bald Muscle Beach type in a radioactive space suit and a helmet that appears to be the same prop from  Robot Monster, somewhat altered."

References

Bibliography
Warren, Bill. Keep Watching The Skies, American Science Fiction Movies of the 50s, Vol I: 1950–1957. Jefferson, North Carolina: McFarland & Company, 1982. .

External links

 
 
 
 

1953 films
1950s science fiction films
Films directed by W. Lee Wilder
United Artists films
Films scored by William Lava
American black-and-white films
American science fiction films
1950s English-language films
1950s American films